This is a list of Italian television related events from 2013.

Events
16 March - 22-year-old singer Daniel Adomako wins the fourth season of Italia's Got Talent.
30 May - Elhaida Dani wins the first season of The Voice of Italy.
9 November - 50-year-old ventriloquist Samuel Barletti wins the fifth season of Italia's Got Talent.
7 December - Olympic gold medal fencer Elisa Di Francisca and her partner Raimondo Todaro win the ninth season of Ballando con le stelle.
12 December - Michele Bravi wins the seventh season of X Factor.

Debuts
7 March - The Voice of Italy (2013–present)

Television shows

RAI

Drama 

 Gli anni spezzati (The broken years) – by Graziano Diana, cycle of three TV-movies in 2 episodes about the Italian red terrorism: The superintendent (with Emilio Solfrizzi as Lugi Calabresi), The judge (with Alessandro Preziosi as Mario Sossi) and The engineer (with Alessio Boni as an imaginary FIAT manager).
 Barabbas – by Roger Young, from the Par Lagerkvist’s novel, with Billy Zane in the title role and Cristiana Capotondi; 2 episodes. 
Trilussa, storia d’amore e di poesia (History of love and poetry) biopic by Ludovico Gasparini, with Michele Placido in the title role; 2 episodes. 
Volare, la grande storia di Domenico Modugno (Domenico Modugno’s great story) – biopic by Riccardo Milani, with Giuseppe Fiorello in the title role and Kasia Smutniak as the wife Franca Gandolfi; 2 episodes. 
Anna Karenina – by Christian Duguay, from the Lev Tolstoj’s novel, with Vittoria Puccini and Santiago Cabrera; 2 episodes. International coproduction.

Serials 
I Saurini e i racconti della fonte magica (The little dinosaurs and the magic source’s tales) – cartoon by Raffaele Bortone.

2000s
Grande Fratello (2000–present)
Ballando con le stelle (2005–present)
X Factor (2008–present)

2010s
Italia's Got Talent (2010–present)

Ending this year

Births

Deaths

See also
2013 in Italy
List of Italian films of 2013

References